Les Spectres d'Inverloch (The Ghosts of Inverloch) is volume eleven in the French comic book (or bande dessinée) science fiction series Valérian and Laureline created by writer Pierre Christin and artist Jean-Claude Mézières.

Synopsis
Inverloch Castle, Northern Scotland, 1986: Laureline, a guest at the castle, goes on her morning ride across Kenchmoor with her host, Lady Seal.  Laureline is anxious: she has been at the castle for some days and has received no further details of what her mission here is.

The planet Glapum't: Valerian has been hunting one of the native Glapum'tiens for some time but with little success.  Finally, using some drugged food he captures his prey.  Securing his prize on board the astroship and preparing for a spatio-temporal jump, he is concerned that he is unable to get a signal from Galaxity.

London, England, 1986: Mr Albert, Galaxity's contact on 20th century Earth, checks out of his hotel room and makes his way on foot to King's Cross where he just makes it in time to catch the train to Scotland.  He is carrying important confidential papers for a meeting.

The planet Rubanis: Colonel Tloc, the chief of police meets with three Shingouz.  He rebuffs their various offers of information until they deliver some shocking news to him – a scanograph that shows that he is infected with the deadly Scunindar virus.  They offer him the location of a possible cure in return for details of the threat faced by Earth.  Tloc tells them that the threat comes from the planet Hypsis.  He gives them the present location of their planet, a mysterious place that regularly changes its location.

West Virginia, USA, 1986: Lord Seal meets in secret with several representatives of the United States Intelligence Community.  The agencies are concerned because a large number of high level members of the defence community have suffered severe mental breakdowns including a general who blew up his missile silos and a submarine commander who sank his own ship.  The situation is so bad that the country's ability to defend itself using its nuclear capability is under threat.  Intelligence information suggests that something similar is occurring in the USSR.  Lord Seal informs them that this matches information that he has been given by the UK Intelligence Services.  The only connection that exists between all the victims were affected by strange devices disguised as cheap ornaments such as a model Pershing missile and a Snoopy toy.  One of the  attendees at the meeting, Gene Rowlands, falls ill during the conversation.  A search of his things reveals a cheap calculator that when switched on emits a strange light.  The meeting ends and Lord Seal indicates that he has every thing he needs for this evening's meeting.  He is driven to a military airport and flies away in a jet fighter.

Galaxity, capital of the Terran Galactic Empire, the 28th century: the Chief of the Spatio-Temporal Service sits alone in his office.  All around him, the buildings of the city are disappearing into a strange mist.  There are no other people to be seen anywhere.  The Chief walks to a spatio-temporal relay and steps inside.

Back at Inverloch Castle, Laureline and Lady Seal are watching the sun set over the castle lawn when a small spacecraft makes a crash landing onto the grass.  Stepping out to investigate, the ship opens to reveal the three Shingouz.  As Laureline leads them into the castle the ship's auto-destruct mechanism activates and destroys the ship.  Shortly afterwards, a jet fighter overflies the castle and one of its occupants, Lord Seal, parachutes from the plane onto the castle lawn.  Before joining the others in the castle, Lord Seal checks that the gardeners have cleared the greenhouse as per his instructions.  Night has now fallen and with it a dense mist.  Lord Seal's Rolls arrives carrying Mr Albert.  Now the only person left to arrive is Valérian who has gotten lost in the fog.  Receiving directions from some gentlemen in a local pub, he reaches the castle and parks the astroship in the greenhouse where the gardeners camouflage it under tarpaulin and palm trees.

With all parties having now arrived at the castle, Lady Seal calls the group to attention.  She reveals that the castle is haunted and that she has received notification that the Ghost of Inverloch will be arriving to join them this evening.  They are interrupted by the Glapumt'ien, who wishes to be called Ralph, who had been forgotten by Valérian.  Leading her guests to a ruined wing of the castle, she explains that the ghost has appeared many times to members of her family over the centuries and is responsible for the good fortune that has followed them through the generations.  Reaching a deserted room among the ruins, Valérian and Laureline are astonished to discover a spatio-temporal relay.  They are further shocked when the relay activates and the “Ghost of Inverloch” reveals himself to be the Chief of the Spatio-Temporal Service.  The Chief tells them that he has brought them together to investigate the catastrophe of 1986, first seen in The City of Shifting Waters, in which a nuclear accident at the North Pole caused the polar icecaps to melt engulfing most of the civilized world under water.  He warns them that if they fail to succeed, then Galaxity will disappear and they will all be reduced to mere ghosts.

Continues in The Wrath of Hypsis...

Main characters
 Valérian, a spatio-temporal agent from Galaxity, future capital of Earth, in the 28th century
 Laureline, originally from France in the 11th century, now a spatio-temporal agent of Galaxity in the 28th century
 Mr Albert, Galaxity's contact in 20th century Earth
 Lord Basil Seal, former Spitfire pilot and chair of the UK Joint Intelligence Committee
 Lady Charlotte Seal (née MacCullough), wife of Lord Seal and heir to the Clan MacCullough, owners of Inverloch Castle
 James, butler to Lord and Lady Seal at Inverloch Castle
 Ralph, a Glapum'tien, an aquatic species of brilliant mathematicians capable of instantaneously calculating the trajectory of any object.
 The Shingouz, a group of three aliens who trade in information
 Colonel Tloc, chief of police on the planet Rubanis
 Priscilla Hewlett-Byrnes and Gladys, two old ladies Albert meets on the train to Scotland.
 Jack, an agent of the United States Secret Service
 Gene Rowlands, agent of the CIA
 Frankie Sawyer, of the Defense Intelligence Agency
 The Chief of the Spatio-Temporal Service

Settings
 Earth, 1986, shortly before the nuclear explosion at the North Pole that causes the icecaps to melt:
 The fictional Inverloch Castle, Scotland and its accompanying village with its pub, the Inverloch Arms, are located in the Scottish Highlands not far from Inverness. Other nearby (also fictional) villages are Galasnock and Kirkcalwell. Close by is Kenchmoor where Lady Seal enjoys riding her horses.
 London, England. A strike by British Airways forces Albert to travel overland to Inverloch Castle. He stays the night in London at the Gainsborough Hotel before travelling to Scotland from King's Cross station on the Flying Scotsman.
 A house used for secret conferences by the US intelligence agencies during the Korean War located in West Virginia in the Appalachian Mountains in the United States.
 The planet Glapum't. A blue, aquatic world populated by the reclusive, but highly intelligent, Glapum'tiens who live inside spherical nests feeding off whatever morsels drift past. Most Glapum'tiens enjoy nothing more than standing watching the stars for nights on end.
 The planet Rubanis, last seen in Métro Châtelet, Direction Cassiopeia, with its never-ending traffic congestion. Its chief of police is Colonel Tloc. The populace live in fear of the medical department, the robot thanatologists, who instantly kill anyone who catches a disease like the Scundindar virus.
 Galaxity, capital of the Terran Galactic Empire, Earth, 28th century. Galaxity and its population are slowly disappearing into the mists of time.

Notes
 The key plot point of this album and its successor ties into the events seen in the album The City of Shifting Waters in which a nuclear explosion at the North Pole had caused the icecaps to melt destroying most of the Earth's cities. It is out of this catastrophe that the utopian Galaxity and the Terran Galactic Empire would arise.
 Additionally, this album reuses many characters and elements that have appeared in previous albums:
 Mr Albert previously appeared in Métro Châtelet, Direction Cassiopeia and Brooklyn Station, Terminus Cosmos
 The Shingouz previously appeared in Ambassador of the Shadows
 The Chief of the Spatio-Temporal Service previously appeared in Bad Dreams and The City of Shifting Waters
 The planet Rubanis was briefly glimpsed in Métro Châtelet, Direction Cassiopeia.
 The first reference to the mysterious planet Hypsis was in Brooklyn Station, Terminus Cosmos
 This album marks the first appearance of Colonel Tloc and the Scundindar virus, both of which play an important part in the album The Circles of Power
 The senior Soviet official Vasili Aleksandrovič Čevčenko and his designated successor, Sergej Šavanidze (not named in this album), seen pictured in Board 27, Panel 3 during Lord Seal's meeting with the American spies, are in fact characters from The Hunting Party (Partie de chasse), a 1983 graphic novel written by Valérian writer Pierre Christin and illustrated by Enki Bilal.
 While the castle and village of Inverloch in Scotland are fictional, there is a real village called Inverloch near Melbourne, Australia. There is also a webcomic by Sarah Ellerton called Inverloch. The similarity in name between the fictional Inverloch and the real Inverlochy Castle near Fort William in the foothills of Ben Nevis should also be noted.
 The strikes that Mister Albert encounters in London could be a reference to the fact that Britain had recently been through a wave of strikes, culminating in the Winter of Discontent.

1984 graphic novels
Science fiction graphic novels
Science fiction comics
Inverloch
Valérian and Laureline
Comics set in Scotland
Fiction set in 1986
Comics set in the 1980s
Fictional buildings and structures originating in comic books